The 1864 Atlantic hurricane season was the third consecutive Atlantic hurricane season with no hurricane landfall in the United States – the longest period on record. Of the five known 1864 cyclones, four were first documented in 1995 by Jose Fernandez-Partagas and Henry Diaz. In the absence of modern satellite and other remote-sensing technologies, only storms that affected populated land areas or encountered ships at sea were recorded, so the actual total could be higher. An undercount bias of zero to six tropical cyclones per year between 1851 and 1885 has been estimated. The first system was initially observed offshore the Southeastern United States on July 16. It peaked as a Category 1 hurricane on the modern day Saffir–Simpson hurricane wind scale. Moving rapidly northeastward, the storm was last noted well east of Newfoundland on July 18.

The next system was observed in the south-central Gulf of Mexico on July 25. Because the cyclone was not tracked further, only a single-point storm path exists. After tropical cyclogenesis was dormant for over a month, another hurricane was spotted on August 26 to the east of the Lesser Antilles. Early on the following day, the hurricane crossed the islands between Dominica and Martinique. After traversing the Caribbean Sea, the storm made landfall in Belize late on August 31, before dissipating the next day. Offshore Belize, several ships encountered the storm. Along the coast, storm surge flooded some areas. The fourth tropical storm was observed off the East Coast of the United States between September 5 and September 9. A number of ships sailing in the vicinity of the storm encountered heavy gales. The fifth and final known tropical cyclone was also tracked offshore the East Coast of the United States. Similarly, many vessels experienced rough seas and severe thunderstorms.


Timeline

Systems

Hurricane One 

This storm was first observed by the brig Hattie Eaton on July 16, while located a few hundred miles offshore the Carolinas. The Hattie Eaton reported sustained winds of 80 mph (130 km/h) – equivalent to a Category 1 hurricane on the modern day Saffir–Simpson hurricane wind scale. Early on July 18, the hurricane weakened to a tropical storm.

Tropical Storm Two 

This storm is known from a single ship report. On July 25, the bark Daniel bound for New York from Matamoros, Tamaulipas encountered a tropical storm off the Alacran reef, north of the Yucatan Peninsula. The vessel spent several hours in the cyclone and was also struck by lightning.

Hurricane Three 

A hurricane was first observed well east of the Lesser Antilles on August 26. The storm moved westward and brought severe weather to Martinique, including hurricane-force winds. Throughout its trek across the Caribbean Sea, the system maintained winds of 80 mph (130 km/h). Late on August 31, the hurricane made landfall in Belize District of Belize. Off the coast, several ships were damaged or sunk. The brig Antonio, the Hannah, and the bark Berkshire were among the ships that capsized. This storm has been paleotempestologically traced in sediment near Gales Point. The system steadily weakened over land.

Tropical Storm Four 

Based on reports from several ships, a tropical storm is known to have existed off the East Coast of the United States between September 5 and September 8. A number of ships approaching New York on September 5 reported an easterly gale. Vessels off Hatteras and Barnegat endured the storm through September 8.

Hurricane Five 

The final tropical cyclone of the season was observed by the Santa Martha early on October 22, while located about 355 mi (570 km) east-northeast of the Abaco Islands. Based on reports from several ships, it quickly moved northward and intensified into a Category 1 hurricane by midday on October 23. Around that time, the hurricane peaked with maximum sustained winds of 80 mph (130 km/h).

See also 

 List of tropical cyclones
 Atlantic hurricane season
 Tropical cyclone observation
 Atlantic hurricane reanalysis project

References 

Atlantic hurricane seasons
 
Articles which contain graphical timelines
1864 natural disasters
1864 meteorology